Thottakadu is a village in the Thanjavur taluk of Thanjavur district, Tamil Nadu, India. The village is given importance for agriculture and it is located beside of Vettaru River. The majority of the people is doing agriculture.

Demographics 

As per the 2001 census, Thottakadu had a total population of 1623 with 819 males and 804 females. The sex ratio was 982. The literacy rate was 82.43.

References 

 

Villages in Thanjavur district